Planman may refer to:

 2639 Planman, a main-belt asteroid 
 Planman (surname), a Finnish surname